The Fokker DC.I was an aircraft produced in the Netherlands in the early 1920s to fulfill a role of combined fighter and reconnaissance aircraft. The company designation chosen by Fokker, "DC" reflected this, with "D" being the Idflieg designation for a fighter during World War I, and "C" being an armed reconnaissance aircraft. The DC.I was a conventional single-bay biplane with staggered, unequal-span wings braced by N-struts and was derived from the Fokker C.IV design. The pilot and observer sat in tandem, open cockpits, and the undercarriage was of fixed, tailskid configuration, with the main units linked by a cross-axle. The wings were of wooden construction, and the fuselage was of welded steel tube covered in fabric.

Ten DC.Is were ordered by the Dutch East Indies Army Air Service, which flew them from 1925 to 1934.

Specifications

References
 
 

Aircraft of the Royal Netherlands East Indies Army
1920s Dutch fighter aircraft
1920s Dutch military reconnaissance aircraft
DC.I
Biplanes
Aircraft first flown in 1923